= Skunk Lake =

Lake in the state of Wisconsin, United States

- Location of Skunk Lake in Wisconsin Location of Skunk Lake in the United States
- Location: Portage County, Wisconsin
- Coordinates: 44°32′44″N 89°15′46″W
- Type: lake
- Basin countries: United States
- Surface elevation: 1,060 ft (323 m)

Skunk Lake is a lake in the U.S. state of Wisconsin.

An early variant name was "Valders Lake".
